Hagik Station is an under-construction railway station on Suin Line of the Seoul Metropolitan Subway system.

Station information
This transit facility or route has not been opened.

Hakik Station is an unopened subway station on the Suin and Bundang Lines of the metropolitan area in Hakik-dong, Michuhol-gu, Incheon. It is an underground section from this station to Incheon Station. On February 27, 2016, the Songdo Station - Incheon Station section of the Suin Line was opened, but this station is scheduled to open after January 2024 in connection with the development of Yonghyeon and Hakik District 1. is pre-installed.Seoul Metropolitan Subway Suin/Bundang Line K268. Located at 587-189, Hakik-dong, Michuhol-gu, Incheon. It means the wing of a crane (鶴) and has the same meaning as in Hakikjin. There is Hakik JC nearby. The Incheon-Songdo section of the Suin Line was opened, but this station has no stops for the time being. The station did not exist on the Suin Line of the existing narrow-gauge railway, and it was not in the Suin Line double-track train plan, but it is a new station that is newly built at the expense of the developer due to the development of the Yonghyeon-Hakik district. The telegraph poles interfered with the construction and relocation work was carried out. The station, which requires a total project cost of 104.2 billion won, is 165m long (for 8 cars) and 27m wide, with 6 entrances and exits. Same case as Dalwol Station. Therefore, even if the Incheon-Songdo section of the Suin Line opens on February 27, 2016, the station will pass without stopping for the time being. The structure is already laid. It operates 216 times a day and is expected to be used by 20,000 people. The platform is in the basement.
It is different according to the Naver map update, but unlike other stations, it is not open in gray, but in yellow, the color of the Suin-Bundang Line.
Incheon Yonghyeon/Hakik District Urban Development, September

around the station 
제2경인고속도로 학익 분기점
현광아파트1차
인천미추홀경찰서
인천병무지청
송도고등학교
옥련여자고등학교
학익고등학교
학익여자고등학교
인주중학교
인천학익초등학교
인천학산초등학교
인천연학초등학교
인천인주초등학교
인천백학초등학교

Hagik-dong 
It is a legal and administrative dong located in the southern part of Nam-gu, Incheon. Hakiksan, the stem of Mt. Munhaksan, is located here. Hakiksan  means 'a mountain in the shape of a crane with its wings spread out', and the name of the mountain was derived from this mountain. The name of Hakik-ri  is confirmed in 『Data on the Support of Joseon』. It was called Hakik-ri in 1903, and then changed to Hakik-dong in 1946. Hakik-dong also has the nickname 'Jeun-ri', which comes from the fact that there lived a person named Je-un  of the Bupyeong-i clan during the reign of King Sukjong of the Joseon Dynasty. In 1981, it became Hakik-dong, Nam-gu, Incheon directly under the direct control of the city, and in 1995, it was reorganized into Hakik-dong, Nam-gu, Incheon.

Hagik Bridge
Hagik Bridge is a bridge with a length of about 1,812m in the section between Incheon Interchange in Yonghyeon-dong, Michuhol-gu, Incheon on the 2nd Gyeongin Expressway and Hagik Junction in Hagik-dong, Michuhol-gu, Incheon.
Since this is the Yonghyeon-dong and Hagik-dong development district, other buildings and structures have not yet been built, and medical facilities, parking lots, and cultural facilities are planned to be built in the future. The closest road nearby is Dokbae-ro, which passes under the Hagik Bridge near the Hagik Junction.
In 1914, it was incorporated into Bucheon-gun and named Hagik-ri by combining Nojeoksan and Jeun-ri. In 1940, it was transferred to Incheon-bu and renamed Hagikjeong, and in 1946 it was renamed Hagik-dong. In 1970, it was divided into Hagik 1 and 2 dong. The legal dong, Hagik-dong, consists of the administrative dong, Hagik 1 and 2 dongs.
name origin
The name of Hakik Bridge is derived from the name of Hakik-dong, where this facility is located.

References

External links

Metro stations in Incheon
Seoul Metropolitan Subway stations
Railway stations scheduled to open in 2024
Michuhol District

한국철도공사 GTX운정역 서희스타힐스 GTX창릉역 힐사이드파크 더블 포항 한신더휴 펜타시티 양주 회정역 파밀리에 장흥역 경남아너스빌 전곡역 제일풍경채 리버파크 음성 푸르지오 마크베르 힐스테이트 과천 디센트로 미추홀구 동행정복지센터